The Beacon School is an independent preparatory day school for intellectually curious students in grades 3–12, owned and operated by Greenwich Education Group (GEG). It is located in Stamford, Connecticut's historic Hubbard Heights neighborhood.  Current enrollment is 40 students with plans to expand to 75 students by 2018.

History
Greenwich Education Group (GEG) is a privately held, for-profit company founded in 2005 by Victoria C. Newman, a former Greenwich Public Schools teacher. Newman quickly outgrew her “one-room schoolhouse” in Livingston Place and moved into the St. Lawrence Club. Demand continued to increase, and in 2006, Greenwich Education Group expanded to new facilities at the Greenwich Water Club.

The name Beacon was inspired by the school's original location on the Mianus River at Beacon Point in Cos Cob, Connecticut.

See also
 Beacon English School

References

External links
 Beacon School Connecticut website
 Greenwich Education Group

Education in Fairfield County, Connecticut